Pedan is an administrative district (kecamatan) in Klaten Regency, Central Java, Indonesia.

Klaten Regency
Districts of Central Java